The L Class are a class of diesel locomotives built by Clyde Engineering, Granville and Eagle Farm, and Commonwealth Engineering (subcontracted by Clyde), Rocklea for the Western Australian Government Railways between 1967 and 1973.

History
With the  Eastern Goldfields Railway between Perth and Kalgoorlie being converted to standard gauge, the Western Australian Government Railways started to take delivery of 23 Electro Motive Diesel GT26C locomotives from Clyde Engineering in October 1967. The design was based on the EMD SD40 reduced in height to fit within the Australian loading gauge. At the time they were comfortably the largest and heaviest diesel locomotive operated by a government operator.

All were delivered from Sydney via Melbourne and Adelaide, necessitating them being placed on broad gauge bogies for the journey between Dynon and Port Pirie.
  
They entered service hauling iron ore trains from Koolyanobbing to Kwinana and the Indian Pacific. However they were quickly removed from passenger trains after it was realised the damage they could cause to the track at higher speeds.

In 1972, Comalco purchased two locomotives of the same design for use on its  line at its bauxite mine in Weipa. These were built with an extra  of ballast for increased adhesion. In 1973, the Western Australian Government Railways took delivery of a further two, funded by Western Mining Corporation as part of the building of a nickel mine at Mount Windarra. The Comalco locomotives were built by Clyde Engineering's Eagle Farm factory, and the WMC funded locomotives were built under subcontract by Commonwealth Engineering at their Rocklea plant.

In 1983, three were leased to V/Line to haul services on the standard gauge Melbourne to Albury line. One even operated through to Sydney in May 1984.

In 1994, following the purchase of GML10, Comalco's R1.001 was sent to Clyde Engineering, Kelso for overhaul. Upon its return in August 1994, R1.002 was sold to Westrail and placed in service as Lw276.

Following the delivery of the Q class locomotives in 1997, many were withdrawn with those remaining in service relegated to trailing locomotive status.

In July 1998, seven were sold to Australian Transport Network. After being overhauled by National Railway Equipment Company, Whyalla, four were placed in service by ATN Access hauling grain trains in southern New South Wales and Victoria. Three were included in the sale of Australian Transport Network to Pacific National in February 2004 while the fourth along with the three unused examples along with one of the operational units were sold to Rail Technical Services, Dynon who resold them to QR National subsidiaries Interail and Australian Railroad Group for use in New South Wales.

The remainder were included in the sale of Westrail to Australian Railroad Group in December 2000. All were included in the sale of Australian Railroad Group's Western Australian operations to QR National in June 2006. After being stored for some years, the Pacific National-owned L's were scrapped in 2015.

All of the locomotives now under the control of Aurizon have been renumbered as the 3100 class. Those fitted with Q-Tron traction control have had the "LQ" prefix applied, those with ZTR traction control "LZ". Some were transferred to New South Wales to haul trains from the Manildra Group's flour mills at Gunnedah, Manildra and Narrandera to Bomaderry from 2003 until 2008.

In 2011, Comalco sold R1.001 to Australian Locolease who placed it in service as L277 and leased it to El Zorro to operate grain trains in Victoria. After several years of storage and irregular use, L277 was sold on to Southern Shorthaul Railroad in 2020 with the loco being transferred to Cootamundra for reactivation work. It was reactivated in September 2020.

In 2018, all Aurizon owned units were placed into long term storage, future uncertain. LZ3111 hauled three sister units to Avon Yard on train 6111 on the 12th January that year before returning light engine as train 6112 back to Forrestfield.

In 2021, Aurizon reactivated LZ3119 and LZ3120 for use on grain trains in New South Wales. After spending a year and a half there, LZ3120 was transferred back to Western Australia in December 2022.

Models of the L Class have been produced in HO scale by two companies: Haskell Co Taiwan and Southern Rail Models.

Class list

AReferences

Australia Wide Fleet List Motive Power issue 96 November 2014 pages 65, 69

External links

Clyde Engineering locomotives
Co-Co locomotives
Diesel locomotives of Western Australia
Railway locomotives introduced in 1967
Standard gauge locomotives of Australia
Diesel-electric locomotives of Australia
Pacific National diesel locomotives